Pretty When You Cry is 2001 erotic thriller directed by Jack N. Green.

Synopsis
Detective Black (Elliott) conducts a procedural interrogation on Albert Straka (Kennedy), a quiet and unassuming man who is a suspect in the brutal and violent murder of Frank (Cavalieri), a drug and sex addict who owns a nightclub. He gets Albert to admit that he had strong feelings towards Frank's wife, Sarah (Elizabeth), but that she was into far too kinky sex for him to ever fall in love with. As the interrogation continues, it is revealed that the sordid sexual relationship among the three grew increasingly bizarre.

Principal cast

Critical reception
From Christopher Null of Filmcritic.com:

From Anee Teepesh of Geniuses Who Have Opinions on Films:

References

External links 

2001 films
Adultery in films
2000s erotic thriller films
American erotic thriller films
HBO Films films
American independent films
Films scored by Normand Corbeil
2000s English-language films
2000s American films